Andy S. McEwan is a Scottish screenwriter and film director.

Life and career
Andy S. McEwan (born 31 January 1985) was born in East Kilbride in Scotland. After studying television production at the Glasgow Metropolitan College, he began working as a freelance screenwriter. In 2010, he teamed up with Mark D. Ferguson and Chris Quick to begin work on the feature film In Search of La Che in which he played a large part in the writing of the film. He also served as a producer, an actor and an assistant director. The film premiered at the Glasgow Film Theatre on 9 November 2011 but received mixed reviews from critics on both sides of the Atlantic. Duane Martin of Rogue Cinema said "As mockumentaries go, this one is a bit of a mixed bag. Some of the characters, and a lot of the story works quite well, but there are a couple of characters and bits of the story that either fall flat or just don’t work at all." Despite this, the film was selected to appear in the spring showcase of the 2014 American Online Film Awards.

In 2012, McEwan reunited with Chris Quick to co-write the short comedy film The Greyness of Autumn. The film followed the story of Danny McGuire, a depressed ostrich living in Glasgow. The film was well received with the films writing receiving high praise. Angie Quidim of 'That's My Entertainment' said "The comedic genius of the dialog from both Chris Quick and Andy S. McEwan address the social commentary about the human condition and the power of perception.  Despite its low budget feel, the laughs contained in the dialog will only have you wanting more." Mark Bell of Film Threat in the United States said "How can you not enjoy lines like 'can his precious hands pleasure you in the way my beak can?' as delivered by an angry ostrich puppet?"

2014 marked the directorial debut for McEwan when he directed the short film Broken Record which he wrote himself. Shot predominately in East Kilbride the film tells the story of Frasier and Tam, a couple of house clearance workers who stumble upon an old trunk full of old records. Convinced they have discovered a small treasure, the pair hatch a plan to steal the records and sell them to the highest bidder. The film was well received and was selected to appear in the 2014 edition of the Portobello Film Festival in London. Mark Bell of Film Threat wrote:  In June, the film screened at the monthly Write Shoot Cut event in Edinburgh with McEwan taking part in a Q&A session alongside Chris Quick and Paul Michael Egan.

He is currently filming Autumn Never Dies, the sequel to his earlier film The Greyness of Autumn.

Filmography

Awards

References

External links

Living people
British film directors
Scottish film directors
Scottish screenwriters
1985 births
Scottish comedy writers